The Turkish Ambassador to the United Kingdom is the official representative of the President of Turkey and the Government of Turkey to the King and Government of the United Kingdom.

List of Turkish chiefs of mission to the United Kingdom 

 Yusuf Kemal Tengirşenk (1924)
 Zekai Apaydın (1924-1925)
 Ahmet Ferit Tek (1925-1932)
 Münir Ertegün (1932-1934)
 Fethi Okyar (1934-1939)
 Tevfik Rüştü Aras (1939-1942)
 Rauf Orbay (1942-1944)
 Ruşen Eşref Ünaydın (1944-1945)
 Cevat Açıkalın (1945-1952)
 Hüseyin Ragıp Baydur (1952-1955)
 Suat Hayri Ürgüplü (1955-1957)
 Muharrem Nuri Birgi (1957-1960)
 Feridun Cemal Erkin (1960-1962)
 Kemal Kavur (1962-1963)
 Zeki Kuneralp (1964-1966)
 Haluk Bayülken (1966-1969)
 Zeki Kuneralp (1969-1972)
 Rıfat Turgut Menemencioğlu (1972-1978)
 Vahap Aşiroğlu (1978-1981)
 Rahmi Gümrükçüoğlu (1981-1988)
 Nurver Nureş (1989-1991)
 Candemir Önhon (1991-1995)
 Özdem Sanberk (1995-2000)
 Korkmaz Haktanır (2000-2002)
 Akın Alptuna (2003-2007)
 Mehmet Yiğit Alpogan (2007-2010)
 Ahmet Ünal Çeviköz (2010-2014)
 Abdurrahman Bilgiç (2014-2018)
  (2018–present)

See also 

 Turkey–United Kingdom relations

References 

United Kingdom

Turkey